FanRocket was a Los Angeles-based creator of online content programming and technologies. The company was founded by Danny Kastner, a contestant on season 3 of The Apprentice.

History 
In a 2007 interview, Kastner stated that the company "combin[es] online social networking and user-generated content with film and television to create cutting-edge interactive social media environments."

FanRocket provided the platform technology for both NBC's online contest Star Tomorrow in 2006, and the CBS online talent search Big Shot Live in 2008.

Also in 2008, the company partnered with Paramount Studios to create VooZoo, a Facebook application that allows users to send and post on their profiles movie clips from the Paramount library.

In December 2008, FanRocket has co-produced Faces of Beautiful You, an online web series for HSN.

In April 2014, the company was listed as a suspended or forfeited business entity by the state of California.

References

Computing platforms